Russell Harlan Meers (November 28, 1918 – November 16, 1994), nicknamed "Babe", was a pitcher in Major League Baseball. He played for the Chicago Cubs in 1941, 1946–47.

Meers made his major league debut for the 1941 Chicago Cubs on the final day of the season. In 1942 he was sent down to the Milwaukee Brewers of the American Association. During the season, Meers joined the Navy where he spent more than three years serving during World War II in the Pacific Theater of Operations. Meers rejoined the Cubs after the war, pitching during the 1946 and 1947 seasons.

References

External links

1918 births
1994 deaths
Major League Baseball pitchers
Chicago Cubs players
Baseball players from Illinois
People from Vermilion County, Illinois
Nashville Vols players